Stefan Kutzsche (born 15 April 1954, in Frankfurt am Main) is a Norwegian paediatrician, anaesthesiologist, ethicist, and educationalist in the health professions.

Education and career

He graduated as a medical doctor at the University of Hamburg in 1983 and obtained a dr.med. (PhD) degree in neonatology from the University of Oslo in 2002, an MHA in health administration and health economics from the University of Oslo (2006) and an MSc in health professions education from the University of Maastricht (2011). He is double board certified in paediatrics and anaesthesiology. In 2013 he completed a certificate in paediatric bioethics at the Children's Mercy Bioethics Centre in Kansas City, MO.

During the 1980s he was a resident at Vestfold Hospital Trust, Akershus University Hospital, and Oslo University Hospital, Ullevål (1985–1991). From 1994 to 2005 he was a senior consultant paediatric anaesthesiologist at Ullevål. He was an assistant professor at the Institute of Clinical Medicine at the University of Tromsø (1993) and a research fellow at the Pediatric Research Institute at the University of Oslo/The National Hospital (1994–1998). From 2000 to 2005 he was a senior consultant in paediatric intensive care medicine at Ullevål, heading the department 2001–2002. From 2005 to 2014 he was a senior consultant neonatologist at Ullevål. He also served with No. 330 Squadron of the Royal Norwegian Air Force in Banak on search and rescue (SAR) and air ambulance missions in northernmost Norway and over the Barents Sea 1993–2005. He was chief physician at the Norwegian Air Ambulance Foundation 2008–2009. From 2014 to 2018 he was an Associate Professor at the International Medical University (IMU) in Kuala Lumpur, and from 2016 to 2018 the Director of the IMU Centre for Education. He has also taken part in voluntary work for the Angkor Hospital for Children in Cambodia. Since 2019 he is special advisor for education at Oslo University Hospital. He is also an advisory member of the IMU Centre for Bioethics and Humanities.

He has formerly been a member and chairman of the Board for Licensing Matters and Foreign Medical Practitioners in Norway (1998–2007), a board member of the Norwegian Society of Pediatricians and editor of its journal Paidos (2009–2014), a member of the Norwegian specialty committee for pediatrics, and a member of the clinical ethics committee at Oslo University Hospital (2012–2014). He is a member of the editorial committee of Acta Paediatrica.

Research
He has published in the fields of neonatology and neuroscience, medical education, bioethics and the history of medicine. In particular, he has collaborated with Ola Didrik Saugstad in research on secondary brain injury in newborn infants as a result of perinatal asphyxia and resuscitation with 100% oxygen or normal air, as part of a project initiated by Saugstad that contributed to the amendment of international guidelines for newborn resuscitation. He has published papers in Pediatrics, Pediatric Research, Biology of the Neonate, Critical Care Medicine, Pediatric Critical Care Medicine, Thrombosis Research, Acta Paediatrica, Acta Anaesthesiologica Scandinavica, and other journals.

Background

He is a son of the physician and microbiologist A.K.W. Kutzsche and Louise Paus Haagaas, and is a grandson of the Norwegian mathematician Theodor Haagaas.

Selected publications

References

External links
Publications by Stefan (Paus) Kutzsche in the Norwegian Scientific Index

Norwegian anesthesiologists
Norwegian neuroscientists
Norwegian neonatologists
Oslo University Hospital people
Academic staff of the University of Oslo
Academic staff of the University of Tromsø
Academic staff of the International Medical University
No. 330 Squadron RNoAF personnel
Medical journal editors
Medical ethicists
University of Hamburg alumni
Physicians from Oslo
Norwegian expatriates in Malaysia
1954 births
Living people